Donald Fox (15 October 1935 – 21 August 2008), was an English rugby league footballer who played in the 1950s, 1960s and 1970s, and coached in the 1970s.

Background
Don Fox was born in Sharlston, near Wakefield, West Riding of Yorkshire, England. He was the younger brother of Peter, and the older brother of Neil Fox, and together they formed one of the legendary rugby league families.

Don holds the Featherstone Rovers record for tries scored (162) and is third on their all-time goal-kicking charts with 503 in 369 appearances, itself the 7th most in Featherstone Rovers' history, having enjoyed 13 years at Featherstone Rovers, before joining Wakefield Trinity in 1965 for £3,000 (based on increases in average earnings, this would be approximately £98,750 in 2013).
A gifted player, he broke the Featherstone Rovers' record points scored in a season, the next winter and was called up for England's game against France. He was an outstanding kicker, scoring 12 goals in a Challenge Cup victory against Stanningley ARLFC in 1964. He was understudy to Alex Murphy on the 1962 Lions tour of Australasia and then moved to  where he earned his sole Test cap for Great Britain against Australia in 1963. He joined Wakefield in 1965, linking up with his young brother Neil, and they enjoyed great success with Wakefield Trinity. After he retired from playing in 1970, he coached Batley from November 1972 to October 1974, before becoming a safety-joiner in the South Yorkshire coalfield. He died in a hospital in Wakefield, West Yorkshire, England.

Playing career

International honours

Great Britain
Don Fox won a cap for Great Britain while at Featherstone Rovers in 1963 against Australia (1-try, 2-goals), he also represented Great Britain while at Featherstone Rovers between 1952 and 1956 against France (1 non-Test match), and he was selected for Great Britain while at Featherstone Rovers for the 1962 Great Britain Lions tour of Australia and New Zealand.

England
Fox won one cap for England, during the 1955-56 European Rugby League Championship, v France on 10 May 1956; France won 23-9.

County honours
Don Fox won caps for Yorkshire while at Featherstone Rovers; during the 1956–57 season against Cumberland and Lancashire, and during the 1958–59 season against and Lancashire, he also won a cap(s) for Yorkshire while at Wakefield Trinity.

Championship final appearances
Don Fox played  in Wakefield Trinity's 21-9 victory over St. Helens in the Championship Final replay during the 1966–67 season at Station Road, Swinton on Wednesday 10 May 1967, and played right-, i.e. number 10, and scored a goal in the 17-10 victory over Hull Kingston Rovers in the Championship Final during the 1967–68 season at Headingley Rugby Stadium, Leeds on Saturday 4 May 1968.

Challenge Cup Final appearances
Don Fox played right-, i.e. number 10, and scored 2-conversions in Wakefield Trinity's 10-11 defeat by Leeds in the 1967–68 Challenge Cup "Watersplash" Final during the 1967–68 season at Wembley Stadium, London on Saturday 11 May 1968, in front of a crowd of 87,100. The match was played on a waterlogged pitch and the score was 11-7 to Leeds when Ken Hirst scored a try under the posts for Wakefield Trinity with the final play of the game. Tries were worth three points at that time, making the score 11-10, but a simple 2-point conversion was all that was needed to give Wakefield an unassailable one-point lead, and win the game. Wakefield Trinity fans were jubilant as the conversion from in front of the posts is by far the easiest kick in rugby league. Fox had already scored two more difficult conversions in the game, and he was such a prolific kicker that it realistically should have presented no problem. However, the waterlogged state of the pitch made this a more difficult proposition, and Fox lost his footing and sliced the ball wide of the posts. The final whistle was blown immediately afterwards, giving Leeds a dramatic one-point victory. Commentator Eddie Waring said of Fox, 'He's a poor lad', a remark which became a widely quoted piece of commentary. Fox had already been chosen to win the Lance Todd Trophy for his performance in the match, but he was disconsolate and trudged off the pitch. Interviewed by David Coleman on television later, he was asked if the trophy was any consolation and replied "not really, no". The boots he was wearing during the game are now on display at Wakefield Museum.

County Cup Final appearances
Don Fox played , and scored a try in Featherstone Rovers' 15-14 victory over Hull F.C. in the 1959–60 Yorkshire County Cup Final during the 1959–60 season at Headingley Rugby Stadium, Leeds on Saturday 31 October 1959, and played  in Featherstone Rovers' 0-10 defeat by Halifax in the 1963–64 Yorkshire County Cup Final during the 1963–64 season at Belle Vue, Wakefield on Saturday 2 November 1963.

Drop-goals (field-goals)
Don Fox appears to have scored no drop-goals (or field-goals as they are currently known in Australasia), but prior to the 1974–75 season all goals, whether; conversions, penalties, or drop-goals, scored 2-points, consequently prior to this date drop-goals were often not explicitly documented, therefore '0' drop-goals may indicate drop-goals not recorded, rather than no drop-goals scored.

Testimonial match
Don Fox's benefit season/testimonial match at Featherstone Rovers took place during the 1963–64 season.

Honoured at Featherstone Rovers
Don Fox is a Featherstone Rovers Hall of Fame inductee.

References

External links
SportsFile: Caught in Time: Leeds win the Challenge Cup, 1968
Obituary in The Telegraph
Obituary in The Times
Obituary in The Independent
Obituary in The Guardian
Rugby Cup Final 1968

1935 births
2008 deaths
Batley Bulldogs coaches
Batley Bulldogs players
England national rugby league team players
English rugby league coaches
English rugby league players
Featherstone Rovers captains
Featherstone Rovers players
Great Britain national rugby league team players
Lance Todd Trophy winners
People from Sharlston
Rugby league halfbacks
Rugby league locks
Rugby league players from Wakefield
Wakefield Trinity players
Yorkshire rugby league team players